Gameela Ismail (Arabic: جميله اسماعيل ) (born 1966) is the president of Al Dostour party, Egyptian politician, rights advocate, activist, media innovator and former television presenter. She was actively involved in calling for and participating in the January 25 Revolution.

She is a defender of freedom of opinion and expression, and the rights of prisoners, workers, women, the poor and the oppressed, Gameela Ismail fought against injustice and corruption in the era of Hosni Mubarak. She was one of the most prominent women in confronting inherited succession and extension of powers, calling for the January 25 Revolution, and pushing for its continuance in the subsequent years, so as to achieve the aims of the revolution and retribution for the martyrs.

Background 
Gameela Ismail (6 April 1966) is an Egyptian politician, television host, media innovator, content creator, and co-founder of the online new media platform Medina (www.medinaportal.com) launched in 2016. Medina provides an alternative, innovative, artistic, and interactive content in Arabic against hegemonic narratives. Gameela writes, films, narrates and directs a series of short films on Medina called Hekayat Gameela [Gameela’s Stories] using her smartphone camera. This has allowed Gameela to pioneer the concept of “personal TV” in the Arab world. In 2017, Gameela’s Stories were given the award for best documentary work empowering women and society by MBC HOPE in Dubai. In 2018, it was a finalist at the WAN-Ifra short films competition in South Africa.

Career 
Gameela has worked in media since her graduation from Cairo University’s Faculty of Communication in 1986. She started her media career with Newsweek’s Cairo bureau as a stringer/translator, then as a correspondent for 20 years. She freelanced with Thomson Reuters, Al-Hayat London daily, the Sunday Times, Cairo Today Magazine, and other publications. In 1990, Gameela started her television career with the Egyptian state Television and presented several award-winning television programs, which were characterized by their unique portrayal of the voices of the young and ordinary people on Egypt’s streets. Gameela hosted the political TV program "E‘adet Nazar" [Reconsideration] on the Egyptian channel Al Nahar after the 2011 Egyptian revolution. In 2016, Gameela co-founded Medinaportal platform and introduced the personal smartphone video based TV films ; Hekayat Gameela , ( Gameela stories) which gave a voice to the marginalized and provided a space for the untold stories.

Political Involvement 
Gameela ran for parliament in downtown Cairo in 2001, 2010, and 2011. She led numerous political battles and took part in founding movements calling for political change and defying the inheritance of power under Mubarak, then fighting against religious and military rule after 2011. Gameela was among the first to call for the 2011 Egyptian revolution. She participated in founding Al-Ghad (Tomorrow) Party in 2004 and served as the spokesperson for its presidential elections in 2005 in Egypt's first presidential elections. In 2012, she participated in founding Al Dostour Party (Constitution Party) and served as the party’s organizational secretary in 2013. In June of 2022, She was elected as the President of (Constitution Party). Gameela has been an advocate for justice, diversity, inclusion, social/political reform, freedom of expression, advancing opportunities for women and millennials, protecting the environment, and animal rights.

Awards and recognition
Gameela has won numerous awards and recognitions. She was named one of the world’s 150 most influential women by Newsweek in 2011 and a “Sister of the Revolution” by the BBC in 2012. She was voted the most important and influential Arab politician in a CNN poll in 2015 and was rated 180th out of the 250 most influential women in the world on social media in 2016. Gameela came 39th in a list of the 200 most powerful Arab women by Arabian Business magazine in 2018.

References

 Living people
 1966 births
 Cairo University alumni
 Egyptian human rights activists
 Egyptian journalists
 Egyptian women's rights activists
 El-Ghad Party politicians
 People of the Egyptian revolution of 2011